Inagta Partido (Isarog Agta) or alternatively Katubung is a nearly extinct Bikol language spoken by a semi-nomadic hunter-gatherer Agta (Negrito) people of the Philippines. It is found on Mount Isarog east of Naga City  particularly in the town of Ocampo where the most recent survey of the language was conducted.

According to Lobel (2013), there are no speakers of Inagta Partido under 60. It is a moribund language. The Ethnologue cites a report from 2000 that there were then only five speakers from an ethnic population of about 1,000.

Inagta Partido has borrowed heavily from Bikol languages such as Bikol Naga and Bikol Partido, but has a non-Bikol substratum.

Notes

References

 

 

Aeta languages
Bikol languages
Languages of Camarines Sur
Endangered Austronesian languages